Robert Sean Moore (born September 27, 1968) is an American professional football coach and former player in the National Football League (NFL). He is the wide receivers coach for the Tennessee Titans of the National Football League (NFL). Moore played in the NFL as a wide receiver with the New York Jets from 1990 to 1994 and the Arizona Cardinals form 1995 to 2001.

Playing career
A 6'3", 202-lb. wide receiver from Syracuse University, Moore played 11 NFL seasons from 1990 to 2001. In 153 games played (146 starts), Moore registered 628 receptions for 9,368 yards and 49 touchdowns. In the 1997 season Moore caught 97 receptions for 1,584 yards and 8 touchdowns and en route to an All-Pro selection. He graduated from Hempstead High School in Hempstead, New York.

His younger brother is Linebacker Brandon Moore also played in the NFL.

Footage of Moore appeared in the hit movie Jerry Maguire. The character Rod Tidwell, played by Cuba Gooding, Jr. wore Moore's #85 jersey number.

Coaching career
In January, 2010, Moore was hired by Doug Marrone as the wide receivers coach at his alma mater, Syracuse University. On February 6, 2014, Moore was added to the Buffalo Bills staff as the receivers coach. Moore was released along with the rest of the Bills coaching staff after Marrone unexpectedly left the Bills following the 2014 season.

On January 29, 2018, Moore was hired as the wide receivers coach for the Tennessee Titans.

References

External links
 Tennessee Titans profile
 

1968 births
Living people
American football wide receivers
Arizona Cardinals players
Buffalo Bills coaches
New York Jets players
Oakland Raiders coaches
Syracuse Orange football coaches
Syracuse Orange football players
Tennessee Titans coaches
High school football coaches in New Jersey
Junior college football coaches in the United States
American Conference Pro Bowl players
National Conference Pro Bowl players
People from Hempstead (village), New York
Sportspeople from Nassau County, New York
Coaches of American football from New York (state)
Players of American football from New York (state)
African-American coaches of American football
African-American players of American football
20th-century African-American sportspeople
21st-century African-American sportspeople